Herbert Wechsler (December 4, 1909 – April 26, 2000) was an American legal scholar and former director of the American Law Institute (ALI).  He is most widely known for his constitutional law scholarship and for the creation of the Model Penal Code. The Journal of Legal Studies has identified Wechsler as one of the most cited legal scholars of the 20th century.

Early life 
Wechsler entered City College of New York at 16 and graduated in 1928, with a bachelor's degree in French. He enrolled at Columbia Law School, where he served as editor-in-chief of the Columbia Law Review and graduated in 1931. After graduation, he joined the faculty and took a one-year leave to clerk for  Justice Harlan F. Stone of the US Supreme Court.

Lawyer 
In 1940, Wechsler went to Washington, D.C. to work for the Department of Justice. He argued five cases in front of the US Supreme Court during that period.

During World War II, Wechsler served as assistant attorney general in charge of the War Division. This included leading the litigation for Korematsu v. U.S., the case challenging the Japanese Internment during World War II.

In 1945 and 1946, he was a principal assistant to US Judge Francis Biddle and US Alternate Judge John J. Parker at the Nuremberg trial, the trial of the principal Nazi war criminals. He then returned to Columbia Law School, where he remained an active professor until 1978, when he took emeritus status.

In 1959, Wechsler delivered his Holmes lecture at Harvard Law School, "Toward Neutral Principles of Constitutional Law." It was also around this time that Wechsler authored a number of casebooks that changed ideas about criminal law and the federal courts. In 1963, Wechsler's proposed official draft of the Model Penal Code was approved, bringing to a close a decade-long project at the American Law Institute. His wife, Doris Wechsler, noted that he considered the Model Code to be his greatest achievement. Shortly after the approval of the Model Code, Wechsler was named director of the Institute, a position which he held until 1984.

In 1964, Wechsler argued the seminal case New York Times v. Sullivan before the Supreme Court. The Supreme Court in that case unanimously held that the First and Fourteenth Amendments barred awards of damages to a public official for defamation relating to his or her official conduct unless the public official proves "actual malice."

Wechsler served as the first chair of the New York Commission on Judicial Nomination from 1977 until 1982.

Accomplishments 
During Wechsler's tenure as director, the American Law Institute completed the second restatement of the Conflict of Laws, Contracts, Judgments, and Torts as well as the original restatement of Foreign Relations Law of the United States and large parts of the Second Restatement of Property. The Institute also conducted various studies in federal taxation and completed the Federal Securities Code, the Model Land Development Code, the Model Code of Pre-Arraignment Procedure, the Study of the Division of Jurisdiction Between State and Federal Courts, and made major revisions to the Uniform Commercial Code. The ALI's Principles of Corporate Governance and the current Restatement of Foreign Relations Law of the United States were also conceived, initiated, and developed under his direction.

Following his retirement as director of the ALI in 1984, Wechsler remained active in the Institute's activities as a member of the council until his death in 2000.

Awards and honors 
In 1993, Wechsler became the third recipient of the American Law Institute's Henry J. Friendly Medal for "outstanding achievement in promoting reform and clarification of the law" and for the way that his "outstanding intelligence, integrity, and devotion to the law... enriched the subjects of Constitutional Law, Criminal Law, and Federal Jurisdiction, as well as legal thinking generally."

Wechsler also received the Association Medal of the New York City Bar Association for exceptional contributions to the honor and standing of the bar in the community.

Wechsler was a member of both the American Academy of Arts and Sciences and the American Philosophical Society.

See also 
List of law clerks of the Supreme Court of the United States (Seat 9)

References

External links 
 
 
 Guide to the Herbert Wechsler papers at the Columbia University Rare Book and Manuscript Library, New York NY

1909 births
2000 deaths
City College of New York alumni
Columbia Law School alumni
Law clerks of the Supreme Court of the United States
Law clerks of Harlan F. Stone
United States Assistant Attorneys General
Scholars of criminal law
Scholars of constitutional law
Fellows of the British Academy
20th-century American lawyers
Members of the American Law Institute
Corresponding Fellows of the British Academy
Members of the American Philosophical Society